Caylus may refer to:

People

 Anne Claude de Caylus (1692–1765), French archaeologist
 Charles de Tubières de Caylus (1698–1750), French naval officer, governor of Martinique
 Claude Abraham de Tubières de Grimoard de Pestel de Lévis, duc de Caylus (c. 1672–1759), French military leader
 Marquise de Caylus (1673–1729), French noblewoman and writer

Places

 Caylus, Tarn-et-Garonne, France

Other

 Caylus (game), 2005 board game by William Attia
 House of Rougé, holding the duchy of Caylus and the title Duke of Caylus